WVRD (90.5 FM) is a radio station  broadcasting a religious format. Licensed to Zebulon, North Carolina, United States, the station is currently owned by Liberty University.

History

Mega-Educational Communications started WAHD in 1990 with a mostly automated soft adult contemporary format. The station was licensed to Wilson, North Carolina, though it barely put a listenable signal there. Later, WAHD played easy listening as "Easy 90.5". In 1991, the station added W260AB, a translator in Raleigh at 99.9 FM. Other formats included CHR/dance and smooth jazz; the station signed off in 1999. Calvary Satellite Network, a Christian talk/ministry service based in Costa Mesa, California  brought the station back in 2001 as WXJC. On September 19, 2002, WXJC became WAJC.

References

External links

VRD
Liberty University